Route 330 is a  long, north–south secondary highway in the southwest portion of New Brunswick, Canada. 

The route's west terminus is in the community of Black Rock. The road travels north-east to the community of Saint-Leolin, where it is known as Boulevard Saint-Joseph. From there, the road continues north to Village-Saint Paul. It ends in Grande-Anse as Avenue du Portage. It neither intersects with other routes nor crosses any major rivers.

See also
List of New Brunswick provincial highways

References

330
330